Cham Chareh Seh (meaning "Cham Chareh 3") is a village in Dowreh Rural District, Chegeni District, Dowreh County, Lorestan Province, Iran. At the 2006 census, its population was 121, in 25 families.

References 

Towns and villages in Dowreh County